Nails is a 1979 Canadian short documentary film directed by Phillip Borsos. It was nominated for an Academy Award for Best Documentary Short,  and was named Best Theatrical Short in 1980 at the 1st Genie Awards.

Synopsis 
A blacksmith is seen labouring at his forge, shaping nails from single strands of steel rods. The scene shifts from this peaceful setting to the roar of a 20th-century nail mill, where banks of machines draw, cut and pound the steel rods faster than the eye can follow.

References

External links

Watch Nails at NFB.ca

1979 films
1979 documentary films
1979 short films
Canadian short documentary films
English-language Canadian films
Documentary films about technology
Films directed by Phillip Borsos
Films without speech
National Film Board of Canada documentaries
National Film Board of Canada short films
Best Theatrical Short Film Genie and Canadian Screen Award winners
Nail (fastener)
1970s English-language films
1970s Canadian films